The National Air Operations Command is one of the Principal Operational Commands of  the Indonesian Air Force that is responsible for air operations including air surveillance, early warning system, air supremacy, and air defense of Indonesian airspace. Koopsudnas plays a vital part for air defense capability of the Republic of Indonesia. This command is held by a three-star air force marshal.

History

History of National Air Defense Forces Command 
At the early of 1962, Operation Trikora was getting underway as the Indonesian National Armed Forces (TNI) were already engaging the military forces of The Netherlands in what is now Papua and West Papua provinces. The National Air Defense Forces Command was established on 9 February 1962 as the air defense division of that operation commanded by AVM H.M.Sujono on the basis of the TNI Joint Service Air Defense Command whose  commander for Papuan air force operations was Colonel Leo Wattimena of the Air Force. At the beginning, the INADF was organized into 2 Air defense sectors covering parts of the Moluccas and the then Netherlands New Guinea, each composed of a number of radar stations. By March 1962, four Air Defense Sectors were active nationwide.

After the conclusion of Operation Trikora, the command was the first to be equipped with surface to air missiles in Southeast Asia, with the arrival of the S-75 Dvina SAM system, which  served alongside the AZP S-60, M1939 61-K, M1939 52-K, Zastava M55, Bofors 40 mm gun and the Oerlikon GDF until the early 1970s, alongside radar stations built with Warsaw Pact and Yugoslav assistance.

The Air Force Air Defense Command, raised on 12 September 1963, form majority of the personnel under the Kohanudnas. Its primary mission is to develop and prepare combat readiness of air defense capabilities of the air force.  The Air Defense Command is based at Halim Perdanakusuma Airport and has 4 air defense wings, which are 100th Missile Defense Wing, 200th Radar Wing, 300th Interceptor Wing, and 400th Radar Wing. Aside from these, personnel of the Army Air Defense Artillery Corps and the Directorate of Air Defense Operations of the Navy, both of the Indonesian Army and Indonesian Navy, respectively and activated in 1962, are under its operational supervision.

History of Air Force Operations Commands 
Air Force Operations Command were established 1951 with Air Cdre Ruslan Danurusamsi as its first commander. In 1976, the Command was renamed into Combined Air Combat Command. In 1985, as part of a major reorganization of the armed forces, the Command was split into Air Force Operations Commands 1 and 2 to oversee supervision over all regional air bases and air force formations within Indonesia on the basis of the Air Regions. On 11 May 2018, Air Force Operations Command 3 was officially formed on the basis of the Air Force Operations Command 2 bases in eastern Indonesia.

History of Air Operations Command 

In January 2022, National Air Defense Command and Air Force Operations Command 1, 2, and 3 were officially merged into one organization - Koopsudnas. The unified service serves as a umbrella institution managing air defense and superiority operations under the Air Force.

Organization 
 Command HQ
 National Air Operations Commands Component
  1st  Air Operations Command 
  2nd Air Operations Command 
  3rd  Air Operations Command 
  Quick Reaction Forces Command

Air Operations Commands
The Air Operations Command is led by a two-star Air Vice-Marshal who oversees the aviation and engineering squadrons, and air base elements of all TNI-AU air bases and subordinate air wings. Each Air Force Base is divided based on function into 2 types, namely, headquarter air base and operation air base. Meanwhile, based on the area and completeness of the facilities, it is divided into 3 types, namely type A, type B and type C. Apart from maintenance matters, Air Squadrons and their subordinate units may move from headquarter airbase to operation airbase in certain operations during combat exercises or warfare. The Engineering Squadron generally serves the maintenance of aircraft belonging to the Air Squadron which are at the same AFB.

Quick Reaction Forces Command

Sector Commands

Notable events

Bawean Incident 

In July 2003, Kohanudnas detected unauthorized military aircraft flying over Bawean Island off the eastern coast of Java for more than two hours, and ordered the Indonesian Air Force to scrambled two fully armed F-16s Block 15 OCU from Skadron Udara 3 to intercept the unauthorized aircraft, which were five US Navy F/A-18 Hornets . The incident ended peacefully through a Friend or Foe hand signal. A US spokesman said that the naval aircraft had sought permission to enter Indonesian airspace while escorting a US aircraft carrier, but that the request arrived too late at the Kohanudnas headquarters in Jakarta due to red tape.

Pakistan International Airlines Incident  
Pakistan International Airlines's Boeing 737-300 was detected entering Indonesian airspace without diplomatic clearance on 7 March 2011. Kohanudnas then ordered the Air Force to scramble a pair of Sukhoi to intercept and force the aircraft to land at Hasanuddin airport.

Papua New Guinea Aircraft Incident 
On 29 November 2011,  Syamsudin Noor Airport's radar detected Dassault Falcon 900 EX that carried Papua New Guinean Deputy Prime Minister H.O.N. Belden Namah entering Indonesian airspace, then the airport's ATC and Kohanudnas tries to contact the aircraft as it is an unscheduled flight, but no response. As Kohanudnas also didn't authorize aircraft flight clearance, they decide to scramble two Sukhoi fighter to intercept and shadowing the Falcon near Banjarmasin, South Kalimantan, for about 37 minutes. It was found that Falcon was applied for flight clearance shortly before take-off and the clearance was not granted yet during the incident. The minister of foreign affairs of Indonesia said that Kohanudnas was conducting an electronic identification with radar and a visual identification by intercepting (the aircraft) according to standard procedures, and no harm occurred.

Gallery

See also 
 Indonesian National Armed Forces
 Indonesian Air Force

References

External links 
  Official webpage

Indonesian Air Force
Air defence forces
Military units and formations established in 1962